Transcription initiation factor TFIID subunit 4 is a protein that in humans is encoded by the TAF4 gene.

Function 

Initiation of transcription by RNA polymerase II requires the activities of more than 70 polypeptides. The protein that coordinates these activities is transcription factor IID (TFIID), which binds to the core promoter to position the polymerase properly, serves as the scaffold for assembly of the remainder of the transcription complex, and acts as a channel for regulatory signals. TFIID is composed of the TATA-binding protein (TBP) and a group of evolutionarily conserved proteins known as TBP-associated factors or TAFs. TAFs may participate in basal transcription, serve as coactivators, function in promoter recognition or modify general transcription factors (GTFs) to facilitate complex assembly and transcription initiation. This gene encodes one of the larger subunits of TFIID that has been shown to potentiate transcriptional activation by retinoic acid, thyroid hormone and vitamin D3 receptors. In addition, this subunit interacts with the transcription factor CREB, which has a glutamine-rich activation domain, and binds to other proteins containing glutamine-rich regions. Aberrant binding to this subunit by proteins with expanded polyglutamine regions has been suggested as one of the pathogenetic mechanisms underlying a group of neurodegenerative disorders referred to as polyglutamine diseases.

Interactions 

TAF4 has been shown to interact with:
 CBX5m 
 TATA binding protein,  and
 Transcription initiation protein SPT3 homolog.

Protein domain

Yeast TFIID comprises the TATA binding protein and 14 TBP-associated factors (TAFIIs), nine of which contain histone-fold domains (INTERPRO). The C-terminal region of the TFIID-specific yeast TAF4 (yTAF4) containing the HFD shares strong sequence similarity with Drosophila (d)TAF4 and human TAF4. A structure/function analysis of yTAF4 demonstrates that the HFD, a short conserved C-terminal domain (CCTD), and the region separating them are all required for yTAF4 function. This region of similarity is found in Transcription initiation factor TFIID component TAF4.

References

Further reading